"Hello Hey" is a debut song by Swedish singer and model Victoria Silvstedt. It was released as a first single off her debut (and so far, the only one) album Girl on the Run. The video for the song was shot in Los Angeles in 1999 and was directed by Anders Hallberg.

Formats and track listings
These are the formats and track listings of promotional single releases of "Hello Hey".

CD single
"Hello Hey" Radio Edit - 3:26
"Hello Hey" Extended - 6:06
"Hello Hey" The Poker Train Mix - 6:10  (Ebop, Pokerboys, The*) 
"Hello Hey" Supernatural Mix Edit - 3:43  (J. Kjellström, J. Udd*, P. Boström*) 
"Hello Hey" Supernatural Mix Extended - 5:19  (J. Kjellström, J. Udd*, P. Boström*) 
"Hello Hey" Video

Chart performance
The song made its debut on Swedish Singles Charts at number 7 in 1999. The song stayed on the chart list for 12 weeks overall.

References

External links
On Discogs

1999 singles
Eurodance songs
English-language Swedish songs
EMI Records singles
Songs written by Andreas Carlsson
1999 songs